"Stop to Love" is a song by American recording R&B/soul artist Luther Vandross. Released in 1986 as the lead single from his album Give Me the Reason. It was his first number-one single on the R&B chart since "Never Too Much" in 1981. The upbeat single was also a crossover hit, peaking at number fifteen on the Billboard Hot 100.

Music video
The official music video for the song was directed by Andy Morahan. It features Vandross and various models lip syncing "stop" while riding around in the streets of Los Angeles.

Track listing

US 7" Single
A-Side "Stop To Love" - 4:08 (Single Version)
B-Side "Stop To Love"- 4:55 (Instrumental Version)

UK 10" Single
A1  "Stop To Love" (Remix) - 5:27
B1  "Never Too Much" -	3:51
B2  "Stop To Love" - (Instrumental) - 5:05

Charts

References

1986 songs
1986 singles
Epic Records singles
Luther Vandross songs
Music videos directed by Andy Morahan
Song recordings produced by Luther Vandross
Song recordings produced by Marcus Miller
Songs written by Luther Vandross
Songs written by Nat Adderley Jr.